G. Sankara Pillai Cultural Complex is a cultural center located in the city of Thrissur, Kerala, India. It was inaugurated on 18 January 2014 by K. C. Joseph, Kerala's Minister for Culture. The complex is named after G. Sankara Pillai, one of the best playwrights in Malayalam literature.

Layout
There will be total 11 stages, media centre, rehearsal hall and a convertible stage in the complex. The 11 stages have been named after the masters of fine arts, drama, music, cinema and literature. The International Theatre Festival of Kerala from 2014 will be held in the cultural complex. There is an air conditioned hostel for artists and a cafeteria which is opened till 10:00 PM.

Performance venues
 K. T. Muhammed Regional Theatre
 Thoppil Bhasi Drama House
 Murali Outdoor Theatre
 S. Guptan Nair Hall
 Prem Nazir Open Air Cinema Theatre
 Peruvanam Narayana Marar Melathara
 O. Madhavan Navajyotsna Theatre
 N.N. Pillai Open Air Theatre
 Surasu Square
 Jose Chiramel Square
 N. Krishna Pillai Avenue
 C.J. Thomas Conference Hall
 Vaikom Chandrasekharan Nair Seminar Hall
 Thikkodiyan Entrance
 V. Dakshinamurthy Garden
 C. N. Sreekantan Nair Guest House
 Premji Media Centre
 M. R. Bhattathiripad Library
 Chembai Music and Archives

References

Culture of Thrissur
Tourist attractions in Thrissur
Buildings and structures in Thrissur